David Lee Ferguson (born 7 June 1994) is an English professional footballer who plays as a left-back for  club Hartlepool United. He has played in the Football League for Blackpool.

Early life
Ferguson was born in Sunderland, Tyne and Wear.

Career

Darlington
Ferguson began his career in Darlington's youth system, breaking into the first team in early 2012. He finished the 2011–12 season with six Conference Premier appearances.

Sunderland
Ferguson signed for Premier League club Sunderland in June 2012 on a one-year contract. He went out on loan to Conference North club Boston United, making his debut on 1 March 2014 when starting a 4–0 home win over Hednesford Town.

Blackpool
Ferguson signed for Championship club Blackpool on 9 January 2015 on a one-and-a-half-year contract, with the option of a further year. He scored his first professional goal on 14 February 2015 in a 4–4 home draw with Nottingham Forest on 14 January 2015, in only his second appearance. The goal was a header from a Jamie O'Hara cross in the seventh minute of stoppage time, and was the final goal of the match. On 4 August 2015, Ferguson was appointed as team captain of Blackpool. He was released at the end of the 2015–16 season.

Shildon
He signed for Northern League Division One club Shildon in August 2016, but moved back to Darlington, now in the National League North, the following January. Ferguson played for England C for the first time in May 2017.

York City

On 6 October 2017, Ferguson signed for Darlington's National League North rivals York City on a contract running to June 2019, after York activated a release clause in his contract. He was signed by manager Martin Gray, who had left Darlington for York days earlier. Ferguson gave up a job in refuse upon returning to full-time football with York.

Hartlepool United
Ferguson signed for National League club Hartlepool United on 5 August 2020 after turning down the offer of a new contract with York. He scored his first goal for Hartlepool with a free kick in a 2–0 home win against Solihull Moors. Ferguson started in the 2021 National League play-off Final as Hartlepool were promoted back to the Football League. In 2020–21, Ferguson contributed 11 assists. His performances earned him a place in the 2020–21 National League Team of the Year.

In January 2022, Ferguson scored the equaliser against Championship side Blackpool in a 2–1 win as Hartlepool reached the fourth round of the FA Cup. On 6 May 2022, Ferguson signed a new two-year contract.

Career statistics

Honours
Hartlepool United
National League play-offs: 2021

Individual
National League Team of the Year: 2020–21

References
England C statistics

Specific

External links

Profile at the Hartlepool United F.C. website

1994 births
Living people
Footballers from Sunderland
English footballers
England semi-pro international footballers
Association football defenders
Association football midfielders
Darlington F.C. players
Sunderland A.F.C. players
Boston United F.C. players
Blackpool F.C. players
Shildon A.F.C. players
York City F.C. players
Hartlepool United F.C. players
National League (English football) players
English Football League players
Northern Football League players